Andrej Kamnik, better known by his stage name Andrelli, is a Swedish DJ and producer. He is best known for remixing Hearts & Colors' song Lighthouse and Lady Gaga's song "Million Reasons".

Early life and career
Kamnik started playing the piano at the age of 5 and began producing electronic music at the age 14. At the age of 19, he formed the trance duo Andrelli & Blue with his brother's friend and signed to Infrasonic Recordings. Their debut single "Imagine" received support from notable DJs such as Armin van Buuren and Ferry Corsten. In 2009, Corsten requested the duo to remix his single "Lost".

Since 2014, Kamnik wrote music for pop musicians and in 2016, he gained international recognition for his remix of "Lighthouse", receiving over 69 million streams on Spotify.

His debut single was released in 2017, titled "Old Man", which was described as a "a marriage between progressive house, tropical house and future bass.".

Discography

Singles

Remixes
2016
Hearts & Colors — "Lighthouse" (Andrelli Remix)

2017
Rihanna — "Desperado" (Andrelli Remix)
Lady Gaga — "Million Reasons" (Andrelli Remix)

References

Swedish DJs
Swedish electronic musicians
Living people
Musicians from Gothenburg
Remixers
Tropical house musicians
Deep house musicians
Electronic dance music DJs
Year of birth missing (living people)